The following are the records in athletics in New Caledonia maintained by New Caledonia's national athletics association: Ligue de la Nouvelle Calédonie d'Athlétisme (LNCA).

Outdoor

Key to tables:

+ = en route to a longer distance

ht = hand timing

# = not ratified by federation

Men

Women

†: did not finish by another source

Indoor

Men

Women

Notes

References

External links
 LNCA web site
New Caledonian Outdoor Records - Men
New Caledonian Outdoor Records - Women

New Caledonia
Records